CloudLinux OS is a commercial Linux distribution marketed to shared hosting providers. It is developed by software company CloudLinux, Inc. CloudLinux OS is based on the CentOS operating system; it uses the OpenVZ kernel and the rpm package manager.

Overview 
CloudLinux OS provides a modified kernel based on the OpenVZ kernel. The main feature is the Lightweight Virtual Environment (LVE) – a separate environment with its own CPU, memory, IO, IOPS, number of processes and other limits. Switching to CloudLinux OS is performed by a provided cldeploy script which installs its kernel, switches yum repositories and installs basic packages to allow LVE to work. After installation the server requires rebooting to load the newly installed kernel. CloudLinux OS doesn’t modify existing packages, so it is possible to boot the previous kernel in the regular way.

AlmaLinux
CloudLinux, Inc. provides AlmaLinux OS, a free operating system intended as a substitute for CentOS.

External links

References 

Linux distributions
RPM-based Linux distributions
Web hosting